Sardab may refer to:
 Sardab, Fars
 Sardab Khaneh Posht, Gilan Province
 Sardab-e Bala, Isfahan Province
 Sardab-e Pain, Isfahan Province
 Sardab, Kurdistan
 Sardab, North Khorasan
 Sardab, Razavi Khorasan
 Sardab, South Khorasan
 Sardab, Sistan and Baluchestan